Liz Thurley (née Wood) (born 6 January 1959) is a British fencer. She competed in the women's individual and team foil events at the 1984 and 1988 Summer Olympics.

She was a six times British champion in the foil at the British Fencing Championships, twice under her maiden name of Liz Wood and four times as Liz Thurley.

References

External links
 

1959 births
Living people
British female foil fencers
Olympic fencers of Great Britain
Fencers at the 1984 Summer Olympics
Fencers at the 1988 Summer Olympics
People from Wanstead
Sportspeople from London